This Hungry Life is the fourth solo album by American singer-songwriter Tanya Donelly, released in 2006. The album was recorded live in front of an audience at a closed hotel in Bellows Falls, Vermont in August 2004.

Track listing
All songs by Tanya Donelly, except where noted.
"New England" – 4:01
"World on Fire" – 3:39
"Kundalini Slide" (Donelly, Dean Fisher) – 4:18
"This Hungry Life" – 6:13
"Littlewing" – 4:01
"To the Lighthouse" – 2:38
"Invisible One" – 4:11
"Days of Grace" (Donelly, Dean Fisher) – 4:32
"Long Long Long" (George Harrison) – 4:58
"River Girls" (Donelly, Dean Fisher) – 3:58

Personnel
Tanya Donelly – guitar, vocals
Dean Fisher – guitars
Rich Gilbert – pedal steel, guitar
Joan Wasser – violin, viola
Joe McMahon – upright bass
Arthur Johnson – drums
Bill Janovitz – vocals

Production
Engineer: Brian Brown
Edited by: Dean Fisher and Brian Brown
Mixing: Paul Kolderie
Mixing engineer: Adam Taylor
Photography: Richard Donelly and Christopher Donelly
Artwork: Hamilton Hughes Design

References

Tanya Donelly albums
2006 albums